Luca Mozzato (born 15 February 1998) is an Italian cyclist, who currently rides for UCI WorldTeam .

Major results

2015
 1st Trofeo comune di Vertova
 3rd Trofeo Buffoni
 6th Trofeo Emilio Paganessi
2016
 1st Gran Premio Sportivi di Sovilla
 2nd Trofeo comune di Vertova
 4th Road race, UCI Junior Road World Championships
 8th Trofeo Buffoni
2018
 4th Ruota d'Oro
 6th La Popolarissima
 8th Trofeo Città di Brescia
2019
 1st Circuito del Porto
 2nd Trofeo Città di Brescia
 5th Ruota d'Oro
 6th Overall Tour de Bretagne
 7th Trofeo Città di San Vendemiano
2020
 4th Grand Prix d'Isbergues
 6th Paris–Camembert
2021
 3rd Nokere Koerse
 3rd Egmont Cycling Race
 6th Grote Prijs Marcel Kint
 7th Scheldeprijs
 7th Overall Deutschland Tour
 8th Eurométropole Tour
 8th La Roue Tourangelle
 8th Elfstedenronde
2022
 2nd Tro-Bro Léon
 2nd Grote Prijs Marcel Kint
 4th Kampioenschap van Vlaanderen
 4th Grand Prix d'Isbergues
 5th Paris–Tours
 5th Grand Prix du Morbihan
 6th Paris–Bourges
 8th Bredene Koksijde Classic
 8th Paris–Camembert
 8th Paris–Chauny
 10th Grand Prix de Fourmies
2023
 5th Le Samyn

Grand Tour general classification results timeline

References

External links
 

1998 births
Living people
Italian male cyclists
People from Arzignano
Cyclists from the Province of Vicenza